This listing includes notable people who were born in Brisbane, Queensland, Australia — as well as notable people who are working in Brisbane, or who began their careers in Brisbane (please see the individual articles for references).

People from Brisbane are either referred to as Brisbanites or Brisbanian.

Artists
 Olive Ashworth (1915–2000), textile designer
 Clark Beaumont, video, performance art
 Irene Chou, long-term Brisbane resident
 Jon Molvig

Aviators

Notable Brisbane-born aviators include:
 Sir Charles Kingsford Smith, pioneer aviator, who, with his crew, made the first flight across the Pacific in his aircraft, the "Southern Cross", from San Francisco, California, United States to Brisbane, Queensland, Australia in 1928.  The 1928 trans-Pacific flight was the first flight from one side of the ocean to the other.

The aircraft is currently preserved and on display in the Kingsford Smith Memorial, a special a climate-controlled sealed glass building near the International terminal at Brisbane Airport

Government, politics and law
Notable Brisbane-born people in this section include:

 Lord Atkin, judge of the English High Court
 Quentin Bryce  , former Governor-General of Australia
 Bill Hayden, former Governor-General of Australia
 Emma Miller, pioneer labour activist and suffragist
 Sir William Webb, High Court of Australia Judge and President of the Military Tribunal in the Far East (which tried Japanese war criminals)

Medical doctors
Noteworthy medics from Brisbane include:

Raphael Cilento, public health physician and eminent medical administrator
Ian Frazer , immunologist and co-inventor of Gardasil
John Kerr, pathologist and first to describe apoptosis
Jeannette Young , former Chief Health Officer of Queensland and Governor of Queensland

Researchers
Notable Brisbane-born people in research include:
 Peter C. Doherty, medical researcher and Nobel Prize winner

Sculptors

 Daphne Mayo, sculptures include the tympanum above the King George Square entrance to Brisbane City Hall, sculptures at the Queensland Art Gallery
 Leonard and Kathleen Shillam, sculptures include the Pelican sculptures at the Queensland Art Gallery
 Christopher Trotter, sculptures include the Brisbane City Roos, kangaroo sculptures in George Street, Brisbane

Singers, dancers, musicians and composers

Notable Brisbane-born people

 Courtney Act, singer and popular drag performer
 Bowen Yang, comedian, actor
 Jason Barry-Smith, opera singer
 Jeffrey Black, opera singer
 Judi Connelli, singer and actress
 Diana Doherty, classical musician
 Lisa Gasteen, opera singer and winner of Cardiff Singer of the World competition in 1991
 Darren Hayes, lead (Vocalist) singer of Savage Garden 1993–2001 (currently solo artist)
 Kate Miller-Heidke, classically trained opera singer
 Mirusia, soprano, lead vocalist with André Rieu, winner of the Dame Joan Sutherland Opera Award 2006
 Patricia Petersen, singer, pianist and actress
 S3RL, DJ, record producer
 Amber Scott, ballet dancer
 Donald Shanks, opera singer
 Bart Stenhouse, jazz fusion musician
 Patrick Thomas, conductor, poet, author
 Garth Welch, principal dancer
 Christopher Wrench, organist

Notable residents

 Li Cunxin, ballet dancer, subject of Mao's Last Dancer
 Robert Davidson, composer
 Edward Guglielmino, composer, researcher
 Gordon Hamilton, composer
 Luke Kennedy, singer
 Stephen Leek, composer
 Liza Lim, composer
 Mungo McKay, actor
 Alexander Voltz, composer
 Brandon Woods, violinist

Music groups with Brisbane origins

 Bee Gees, music group
 Butterfingers, music group
 Cub Sport, music group
 The Goon Sax, music group
 Ball Park Music, music group
 Dune Rats, music group
 DZ Deathrays, music group
 Odd Mob, music group, EDM duo
 The Go-Betweens, music group
 The Grates, music group
 Hatchie, dream pop band
 Indecent Obsession, music group
 The Jungle Giants, music group
 Last Dinosaurs, music group
 Powderfinger, music group
 Regurgitator, music group
 The Riptides, music group
 The Saints, music group
 Savage Garden, music group
 The Screaming Tribesmen, music group
 Brad Shepherd, musician, Hoodoo Gurus
 Sheppard, music group
 Billo Smith, musician and Cloudland band leader
 TwoSet Violin, classical musicians and internet musical comedy duo, composed of violinists Eddy Chen and Brett Yang. 
 The Veronicas, music group, twin duo
 Violent Soho, music group

Sports teams
Brisbane is home to multiple sports teams such as the Brisbane Broncos, who currently play in the NRL.
Rugby League teams: Brisbane Broncos, Brisbane Tigers.
Football teams: Brisbane Roar, Brisbane Strikers, Queensland Lions.
AFL Teams: Brisbane Lions.
Rugby Union Teams: Queensland Reds, Queensland Country and Brisbane City.
Cricket Teams: Brisbane Heat.
Other Sports: Brisbane Bullets (Basketball), Brisbane Bandits (Baseball), Queensland Firebirds (Netball).

Athletics
Brisbane is also the home of:

 Scott Dixon, Brisbane born New Zealander, Indycar driver
 Roy Emerson, one of the most successful tennis players in the history
 Erika Geisen, German-born, IFBB professional bodybuilder
 Darren Lockyer, rugby league footballer
 Johnathan Thurston, rugby league footballer
 Pat Orreal, Australian darts player
 Samantha Stosur, a Grand Slam champion
 Laura Taylor, swimmer
 Jeff Horn, (lightweight world champion Boxer)

Stage and screen

Brisbane-born actors, actresses, producers, playwrights and comedians include:
 Jacob Elordi, actor
 Jacinda Barrett, actress
 Ray Barrett, actor
 Diane Cilento, actress
 Barry Creyton, actor
 Janet Fielding, actress
 Claire Holt, actress
 Lincoln Lewis, actor
 George Miller, director
 Levi Miller, actor
 Matt Okine, comedian, actor, musician
 Barry Otto, actor
 Miranda Otto, actress
 Patricia Petersen, actress, playwright, director, producer
 John Stanton, actor
 Leonard Teale, actor
 Josh Thomas, comedian
 Rowena Wallace, actress

Actors, actresses and playwrights who began their careers in Brisbane, or live in Brisbane, include:

 Bille Brown, actor, studio named after him at the home of the Queensland Theatre Company
 Carol Burns, actress
 Diane Cilento, actress
 Penny Downie
 Judith McGrath
 Geoffrey Rush, actor
 Sigrid Thornton, actress

Writers and journalists
Writers and journalists who live in Brisbane include:

 Thea Astley
 Leigh Diffey
 Chris Dore
 Melissa Downes
 Nick Earls
 Benjamin Law
 Michelle Law
 Andrew Lofthouse
 Hugh Lunn
 David Malouf
 Andrew McGahan
 George Negus, journalist, television presenter and radio host
 Oodgeroo Noonuccal
 Judith Wright

Other
 Bree Warren, model
 Elise Barney, postmistress
 Dane Beesley, photographer
 Gabriel, youtuber

See also

 Arts and culture in Brisbane
 Popular entertainment in Brisbane

!
People
Lists of people by city in Australia
Lists of people from Queensland